The Darunta training camp (also transliterated as Derunta) was one of the most well-known of many military training camps that have been alleged to have been affiliated with al Qaeda.

Training with poisons
CNN published a story in which they claimed to have acquired videotapes showing al Qaeda experiments poisoning dogs with chemical weapons, at Darunta.

Location

The camp is reported to have been near Jalalabad.
According to The Guardian, it was 15 miles from Jalalabad, just north of the village of Darunta across the dam. 
According to a paper by Hekmat Karzai, published by the Pentagon
the camp was really a complex of four camps, eight miles from Jalalabad.
Karzai wrote that the four camps were:

The CIA provided intelligence, pinpointing Osama bin Laden's presence, that enabled Northern Alliance allies to bombard him in at the Darunta camp in 1999.

The documents from some Guantanamo captives, such as Abbas Habid Rumi Al Naely,
state that the Khalden training camp was also located in Darunta.

Administration
Some sources claim the director of the camp was Midhat Mursi.

Dispute over whether Darunta was an al Qaeda camp
During his Administrative Review Board Abdul Bin Mohammed Bin Abess Ourgy 
acknowledged attending the Darunta camp, but he disputed that it was affiliated with al-Qaeda.
He asserted that the Derunta camp was a non-al Qaeda camp, that dated back to the Soviet occupation of Afghanistan, that it was originally run by the Hezbi Islami, and that after his attendance there the Derunta camp was one of the many non-al Qaeda camps that the Taliban shut down at al Qaeda's request.

Other Guantanamo captives have reported that the similarly well-known Khalden training camp was not an al-Qaeda camp, and was shut down in 2000, 
at Osama bin Laden's request.

Alleged attendees

References

History of Nangarhar Province
Al-Qaeda facilities